Unaizah or officially The Governorate of Unaizah (also spelled Onaizah, Onizah, or Unayzah) is a Saudi Arabian city in the Al Qassim Province. It lies south of the province capital Buraydah and north of Riyadh, the capital of the Kingdom of Saudi Arabia. It is the second largest city in Al-Qassim Province with a population of 163,729 (2010 census).

Historically, Unaizah was an important stopping point for Muslim pilgrims coming from Mesopotamia (now Iraq) and Persia (now Iran) on their way to Makkah. Many scientists and historians believe that Unaizah was inhabited hundreds of years before the spread of Islam, citing its reference in numerous poems from some of the most important poets of pre-Islamic Arabia such as Imru' al-Qais.

Geography
Unaizah is in the south of Al-Qassim Province and at the heart of the historical region of Najd. It is located roughly 30 kilometers from Buraydah (the capital of the province) and more than 300 kilometers north of the Saudi capital, Riyadh. Unaizah lies in the northern-central region of the Najd and to the south of the Wadi al-Rummah (Rumma Valley), which is the longest valley on the Arabian peninsula. It is surrounded by sand dunes to its north and west, which are known locally as the Al-Ghamis Sands. The Al-Ghadha Woods are located to the north of the city. Next to Unaizah is the Al-Aushaziyah salt lake (or Sabkha), which is considered an official part of the city.

Climate
Unaizah has a hot desert climate (Köppen Climate Classification BWh), with long, extremely hot summers and short, very mild winters. The city experiences very little precipitation, especially in summer, but receives a fair amount of rain in March and April. It is also known to have dust storms during which the dust can be so thick that visibility is under .

Agriculture

Unaizah is an agricultural area and produces wheat and barley of various strains. The region also grows grapes, grapefruits, lemons, leeks, mandarins, oranges, pomegranates and dates.

Leeks (kurrat) are a very important part of the local culture of Unaizah. They are popular among the locals and comprise a significant portion of the local agricultural industry.

An annual Date Season Festival has been held in September since the early 2000s, giving Unaizah the distinction of hosting the second largest date festival in the Persian Gulf and the Middle East. The festival rivals the date festival of neighboring Buraydah's, which is sometimes known as "Buraydah, the City of Dates".

Unaizah's 2008 (4th) annual Date Festival was known as the "Unaizah International Date Festival", though the city's title "Unaizah, the Kingdom of Dates" was retained as a motto. Many people from different places of the Middle East come to see this festival and buy dates because they know there is a good quality of dates.

Government

It carries out the civic administration for the Metropolitan area of Unaizah. The municipality was established for the purpose of maintaining villages, regulating construction projects and systematizing public health, safety measures and the construction of the infrastructure of the city such as roads, the stormwater drainage network and street lighting. The Unaizah Municipality has 3 main agencies:

Services Agency : Responsible of maintenance and operation of facilities in the city.
Project Management Agency: Responsible of managing and regulating the construction projects in the city.
Urbanization and Planing Agency: Responsible of urban planning and administrating lands and properties in the city.

The municipality has had 16 mayors since it was founded.

there is 18 villages and offices within the range of Unaizah Municipality.

Education
Unaizah is home to some pioneers in education; the first Saudi person from Al-Qassim Province to earn a PhD. degree was from Unaizah, and his name was Dr. Abdulaziz Al-Khowaiter. The first Saudi female from Al Qassim Province to earn a PhD degree was also raised in this city.  Her name was Dr. Ebtisam Al Bassam.

One of the first cities to embrace female education in Al-Qassim Province and Najd was Unaizah. It faced resistance from neighboring provinces and brought Unaizah at the forefront of a national debate. After lengthy negotiations, the capital city of Qassim, Buraidah a sister city of Unaizah, officially recognized the right of an education for females, partly due to King Abdulaziz's interference in settling the dispute.

Today, there are many public schools in Unaizah for all three educational levels (primary, intermediate, and secondary). There are also two private schools and one private international school. There is also a boys' technological secondary school in the city and a technological college, as well as a girls' educational college. Qassim University is located approximately 30 kilometers north of the city, and enrolls both males and females.

Western travelers
The people of Unaizah are well known for their hospitality and acceptance for people from other races and religions. The famous Charles Montagu Doughty lived in the city during his odyssey and wrote highly about the city.

Amin al-Rihani (the famous Franco-Lebanese scholar and traveler) spoke highly of the city's architecture and works of art in his book "Kings of Arabia" likening it to Paris thereby coining the nickname "Paris of Najd" for the city.

Tourism

There are twelve tourist festivals and activities recognized by the Saudi Commission for Tourism & Antiquities, and a calendar has been made for these events.

The tourist attractions in Unaizah range from festivals to private meetings in family ranches. Some of the most notable venues in which festivals are held are the following:

 Almusawkaf
 Onaizah Mall
 Othaim Mall
 Al-Ghada Park
 Al Bassam Mansion, a traditional house and a private museum
 Al Hajeb Parks
 Al Hamdan House, a traditional house and a private museum
 Asia Resort and Park
 Dream Land, the largest theme park in Al Qassim Province and reportedly the Central Region
 Judaida Local Market
 King Fahd Cultural Center
 The Roman amphitheater
 Salih Bin Salih Cultural Center
 The Unaizah House for Traditional Legacy
 Caravanserai Museum, a little museum of antiques, family memories, traditional things, and historical stories

There are five hotels in Unaizah, two of which are currently under construction, in addition to the rental apartments and suites distributed all around the city:

 Al Fahd Crown (under construction)
 Golden Tulip (under construction)
 Radisson Blu Hotel (under construction)
 Onaizah Hotel
 Boudl

Although Unaizah is thought to be relatively more accepting of visitors than its neighbors, its tourism industry faces criticism for a number of reasons. One such criticism is its disregard for infrastructure maintenance.

Culture

Religion

All of the Saudi citizens of Unaizah are Sunni Muslim with a small minority of Dharmic religions, (mostly Hinduism) brought and practiced in the city by Asian workers (mainly Indians). As the rest of Saudi Arabian cities, non-Islamic worship houses are not allowed. The majority of the city's inhabitants are socially conservative. One of Saudi Arabia's leading religious clerics Muhammad ibn al Uthaymeen was a student of the Sheikh Abd ar-Rahman ibn Nasir as-Sa'di, an Unaizah native. Muhammad ibn al Uthaymeen was born and raised in Unaizah. He lived in Unaizah where many mosques have been built and named after him.

Cuisine 
The Qassimi cuisine in general, and the cuisine of Unaizah is very famous for its delicious food, and for its renowned and tasty traditional meals such as Jereesh, Margoug, Gersan, and Metazeez.

As for sweets, along with other Qassimi sweets, the Qassimi Kleeja is a well-known sweet all over Saudi Arabia and in Eastern Arabia.

Like other Saudi cities, the Najdi Kabsa is the most traditional lunch. The Yemeni Mandi is also popular as a lunch meal.

Western origin junk food is also popular in the city. McDonald's, Subway, Starbucks, Domino's Pizza, Herfy, Pizza Hut, Pizza Inn, Little Caesars, Hardee's, and KFC among others are widely distributed in Unaizah.

Sports

Unaizah is very active in terms of sports. Football is the most popular sport all over Saudi Arabia, and it is very popular in Unaizah, it is played in school's P.E. (i.e. Physical Education) lessons, and it is common to see a group of kids playing it in the streets.

There are two local clubs in Unaizah, the Saudi Al Najmah club, and the Al Arabi club.

Population
The city has experienced very high rates of population growth. Unaizah officially counted population in the city limits in 2010 was 163,729.

Media
Unaizah is served by six major Arabic-language newspapers, Al Jazirah, Al Riyadh, Okaz, Al Watan, Al Hayat, Al Yaum. Unaizah has one local magazine, that issues every four months, it is called Paris Najd, named after the widest spread nickname of Unaizah. In addition to many other national and international magazines distributed everywhere in the city's markets.

Television stations serving the city area include Saudi TV1, Saudi TV2, Saudi TV Sports, Al Ekhbariyah, ART channels network and hundreds of cable, satellite and other specialty television providers.

Ruling dynasty
The city has been ruled by the Al Sulaim family (Sons of Sulaiman Al-Zamil) since 1818. They came to power when Prince Yehya Al-Sulaim in 1822 killed the governor appointed by the Ottoman emperor, Abdullah Al-Jamei. This dynasty still rules the city according to a written treaty between them and the Saudi royal family. Some of the most famous families in Saudi Arabia originate from Unaizah, including Al Juffali, Al Ohaly, Alsmaeel, AlGarawi, Al Abalkhail, Al Ghothami, Al Hatlani, Al Ghumayz, Al Sulaiman, Al Hamdan, Al Akeel, Al Fadl, Al Tamimi, Al Zamil (ALZamel), Al Olayan, Al Bassam, Al Gadhi, Al Matrody, Al Salloum, Al Saheel, Al Subaiee, Al Senany, Al Mansour, Al Yahya, Al Thukair, Al Turki, Al Dubayan, Al Shoshan, Al Shubaili, Al Shebel, Al Damigh, Al Othaimeen, Al Malloohi, Al Marzooki, Al Manei, Al Se'di, Al Abeeki, Al Houthi, Al Khwaiter, Al Sowayil, Al Daffaa, Al Jaffali, Al Dukhayyel, Al Dakheel, Al Abdeli, Al Suhaimi families and many others.

 Mohammad al-Yahya, first Saudi Arabian CEO at the bank of HSBC
 Heythem Abdullah ALZamel, one of the First Saudi Trauma/Acute Care Surgeons; educated and trained in the United States.
 Abdullah al-Senany, poet, educator, and calligrapher
 Azzam al-Kadi, laparoscopic and trauma surgeon, public figure, and assistant professor at Al Qassim University
 Mohammad al-Sebayel, the first Arab surgeon to perform a human liver transplant
 Abdulaziz al-Hazzaa, comedian notable for his different voice levels.
 Musa'ad al-Senany, Saudi Minister of Labor and Social Affairs
 Khalid Al-Mansour, Saudi retired footballer
 Abdullah al-Nuaim, Riyadh city manager, vice president of King Saud University, founder and President of the Board of Trustees, King Fahd National Library
 Abdulaziz al-Nuaim, member of the Saudi Shura Council.
 Abdullah al-Hamdan, Saudi Air Force general
 Abdullah bin Sulaiman al-Hamdan, Prime Minister, Minister of Finance, adviser to King Abdulaziz
 Abdullah Al Shebel, president of Imam Muhammad ibn Saud Islamic University
 Abdul Aziz Bin Abdullah Al Zamil, industrial engineer and politician, Minister of Industry and Electricity
 AbdalRahman al-Subeit, vice president of the Saudi Arabia National Guard
 AbdalRahman Abalkhail, Minister of Labor and Social Affairs and Saudi Ambassador to Egypt
 Yousef Al-Othaimeen, Minister of Social Affairs
 Mohammad Al-Sowayel, President of King Abdulaziz City for Science and Technology
 Ahmad Al Dubayan, director of the Islamic Cultural Centre in London
 Ali Al Khayat, poet and writer
 Abdullah Al Shoshan, poet
 Abdullah Al-Houthi, Former General Manager and Controller of Sabick Inc 
 Saleh Al-Dabibi, Lawyer 
 Muhammed Al-Houthi, Former Goalkeeper for Al-Najma SC and the Saudi International Team. Featured on the "Coke Collectible Cans" that featured various "Gold Star" players on the Saudi Arabia National Team. He is seen in the first row, third can.
 Abdul Rahman Al-Dabibi, Former Captain of Al-Camel Milk FC.
 Ibrahim bin Abdullah Al Suwaiyel, former Saudi Ambassador to the United States
 Ebraheem Alsuleiman (Alakeel), former chief of Crown Prince Faisal's Royal Court and former Saudi Ambassador to Egypt
 Yusef Al-Bassam, President of the Saudi Development Fund
 Lubna Olayan, prominent businesswoman
 Muhammad Al Shubeili, former Saudi Ambassador to Iraq and Malaysia
 Muhammad Al Zughaiby, Minister of Transportation
 Abdulmohsen Al-Bassam, Retired officer in the Royal Saudi Air Force and a former astronaut. He was the back-up payload specialist for Sultan bin Salman bin Abdulaziz Al Saud on STS-51-G.
 Nassir Al-Salloum, Minister of Transportation
 Dawood Alsulaim, pilot, major general, and former Saudi Military Attaché to the United Kingdom.
 Saleh Al Abbad, former chief of the Saudi Royal Court.
 Saleh Al Nugaidan, draughtsman, painter, and photographer.
 Sulaiman S. Olayan, one of Saudi Arabia's leading businessmen whose autobiography is titled "From Unaizah to Wall Street."
Sulaiman Al Sulaim, former Minister of Commerce and Finance and Chairman of Saudi American Bank
Abdulrahman Rashed Alkhayat, Royal Saudi Navy admiral
 Saad Al-Sowayan, anthropologist and writer
 Abdul-Rahman ibn Nasir al-Sa'di, a Sunni Muslim scholar and former imam of the city's Jami' mosque
 Muhammad ibn Uthaymeen, a Sunni Muslim scholar and former imam of the city's Jami' mosque

In the news 
Unaizah is well known for its hospitality, hence, there are a variety of tourism Festivals in the year. These include dates, and healthy crops festivals. There is also a bi-annual cultural festival which is a trademark for this city.
It was the only city of the Najd region to invite a Saudi Shiite cleric to speak in a public event, in a grass-roots effort to promote a united national identity. This drew criticism from conservatives in neighboring cities.

Gallery

See also
 Unaizah Municipality
 Najd
 `Anazzah

References

External links
 Information about the city
 Unaizah unofficial site (ParisNajd)
 Unaizah's Department of Education
 Unaizah's Technological College
 Sheikh Abdulrahman Bin Sedi Secondary School
 Unaizah's largest forums online
 Dakkat Unaizah forums
 Youth of Unaizah forums 
 Unaizah's poets forums 
 Janah (a district in Unaizah) Forums
 Municipality website

 
Populated places in Al-Qassim Province